Timeform is a sports data and content provider located in Halifax, West Yorkshire, England. Founded in 1948, it provides systematic information on form to  punters and others involved in the horse racing industry. The company was purchased by the sports betting exchange Betfair in December 2006. Since 2 February 2016, it has been owned by Flutter Entertainment.

History
Portway Press Ltd was formed in 1948 by Phil Bull, who wanted to establish a mathematical link to a horse's performance, based on the time the horse recorded. At a time when such data was virtually unheard of, Bull started publishing a racing annual, which evolved into the "Racehorses Of.." series.  The company was purchased for a reputed £15 million by the sports betting exchange Betfair in December 2006.

Data system
According to Timeform, one of its ratings represents "the merit of the horse expressed in pounds and is arrived at by careful examination of its running against other horses using a scale of weight for distance beaten which ranges from around 3 lb a length at five furlongs and 2 lb a length at a mile and a quarter to 1 lb a length at two miles".

Timeform ratings for three-year-olds and up on the Flat:

 140+: an all-time great horse
 135–139: an outstanding horse
 130–134: above average Group 1 winner (a "top-class racehorse")
 125–129: average Group 1 winner
 116–124: average Group 2 winner
 110–115: average Group 3 winner
 100–105: average Listed Race winner

Timeform states that the very poorest horses may be rated as low as 30, with the very best horses rated 130 and above. Two-year-old ratings are slightly lower than those for older horses. It also notes that only a very select number of horses have achieved a rating of 175 and above for hurdling (16) or 182 and above for chasing (20).

The Beyer Speed Figure used in the United States is similar to a Timeform rating. The popular rule of thumb for comparing these two numbers is to add 12–14 points to the Beyer score to estimate the Timeform number.

Flat vs hurdle vs steeplechase 
Timeform maintains different scales for horses racing on the flat, over hurdles and over fences. The scores cannot be compared for the obvious differences between the race types. For instance, Arkle at 212, Flyingbolt at 210, Sprinter Sacre at 192 are then followed by Mill House and Kauto Star, both at 191, are the highest rated steeplechasers. The highest rated horses over hurdles are Night Nurse at 182, Istabraq and Monksfield, both at 180, and Persian War at 179. The table below lists scores for flat horses only starting with the highest, rated at 147 which is the British horse Frankel.

Publications
Annually in March, the company puts out its book Racehorses of ...., which currently contains more than 1,200 pages and provides information and ratings on the top flat horses in Australasia, Dubai, France, Germany, Hong Kong, Italy, Japan, North America and Scandinavia. Also, annually in October the company publishes Chasers and Hurdlers, a thorough review of every horse that ran under National Hunt rules in Britain, as well as the best National Hunt horses to have run in Ireland and France.

Timeform publishes a number of other books. Its Horses to Follow: Flat Season is composed of short essays on fifty horses deemed worthy of following in the upcoming year's classics. The horses are selected by Timeform's own team of experts along with five leading broadcasters. The book also provides a guide to the most significant two-year-old performances from the previous year.

Timeform also compiles a system based on speed and class which appears in the Daily Racing Form for all horse racing events run in the United Kingdom, Ireland, France and the United Arab Emirates.

Top-rated Thoroughbreds on flat courses
The figures below are the official all-time highest rankings for horses who raced in Australia, Dubai, Europe, Hong Kong, Japan and Scandinavia, as supplied by Neil O'Connor of Timeform. Until very recently (approximately 2000), horses who raced exclusively in America were never given Timeform ratings, so they can not be compared directly to their European counterparts.

Top-rated horses on chase courses

The figures below are official all-time high weights for horses racing under National Hunt rules on chase courses.

Top-rated Thoroughbreds on hurdle courses

The figures below are all-time ratings accorded by Timeform for race horses that competed under National Hunt rules on hurdle courses.

References

External links
 Timeform official website

Publishing companies established in 1948
Magazines published in England
Companies based in Halifax, West Yorkshire
Horse racing organisations in Great Britain
1948 establishments in England
Publishing companies of England